Prochoreutis argyrastra is a species of moth of the family Choreutidae. It is found in Ethiopia.

References

Endemic fauna of Ethiopia
Prochoreutis
Insects of Ethiopia
Moths of Africa